Events from 2020 in New Caledonia.

Incumbents 

 High Commissioner: Laurent Prévost
 President of the Government: Thierry Santa
 Vice President of the Government: Gilbert Tyuienon
 President of Congress: Roch Wamytan

Events 
Ongoing – COVID-19 pandemic in New Caledonia

 4 April – President Thierry Santa went into self-isolation after a member of his staff tested positive for COVID-19.
4 October – An independence referendum was held, with 53.26 percent of voters opposed to independence. Turnout was 85.69 percent.
28 October – Protests started over plan to sell Vale nickel mine to consortium led by Trafigura, protestors blocked roads and port Noumea.

Deaths

References 

2020 in New Caledonia
2020s in New Caledonia
Years of the 21st century in New Caledonia
New Caledonia